Campagnolo may refer to:
 Campagnolo, Italian manufacturer of high-end bicycle components with headquarters in Vicenza, Italy
 Gitane–Campagnolo, French professional cycling team that existed from 1969 to 1977
 Campagnolo ErgoPower, integrated gearshift and brake lever system designed by Campagnolo for racing bicycles

Persons 

 Ana Caroline Campagnolo, Brazilian politician, author, lecturer and historian
 Andrea Campagnolo, Italian football goalkeeper
 Iona Campagnolo, Canadian politician
 Luisa Vania Campagnolo, Italian luthier
 Tullio Campagnolo, Italian racing cyclist, inventor, founder of the bicycle component company

See also 

 Campagna (disambiguation)
 Campagnola (disambiguation)
 Campagnoli (disambiguation)